The 2021 Dwars door Vlaanderen was a road cycling one-day race that took place on 31 March 2021 in Belgium. It was the 75th edition of Dwars door Vlaanderen and the 11th event of the 2021 UCI World Tour. It was won by Dylan van Baarle.

Teams
All nineteen UCI WorldTeams and six UCI ProTeams participated to the race. Of the twenty-five teams, only  did not compete with the maximum allowed seven riders. A few riders were found to have been in close contact with staff members who tested positive for COVID-19, the same positive test results that had forced them to withdraw from Gent–Wevelgem three days prior, so they had to be in isolation for a week. The short notice prevented the team from making last-minute substitutions, so they decided to field only five riders.123 of the 171 riders to start the race finished.

UCI WorldTeams

 
 
 
 
 
 
 
 
 
 
 
 
 
 
 
 
 
 
 

UCI ProTeams

Results

References

Dwars door Vlaanderen
Dwars door Vlaanderen
Dwars door Vlaanderen
Dwars door Vlaanderen